The 1981–82 Town & Country League season was the 40th and the last under this name in the history of Eastern Counties Football League a football competition in England.

League table

The league featured 22 clubs which competed in the league last season, no new clubs joined the league this season.

Braintree & Crittall changed name to Braintree.

League table

References

External links
 Eastern Counties Football League

1981-82
1981–82 in English football leagues